The 1999 King of the Ring was the seventh annual King of the Ring professional wrestling pay-per-view (PPV) event produced by the World Wrestling Federation (WWF, now WWE) that featured the 13th King of the Ring tournament. It took place on June 27, 1999, at the Greensboro Coliseum Complex in Greensboro, North Carolina. 

The main show included ten matches in total with several matches preceding the pay-per-view portion of the show, broadcast on live television as part of the WWF's Sunday Night Heat show. The main event was a Ladder match featuring Shane McMahon and Vince McMahon defeating Stone Cold Steve Austin for control of the WWF. The other main match was a WWF Championship match where The Undertaker defeated The Rock to retain the title. Additional featured matches on the undercard included the 1999 King of the Ring tournament final between Billy Gunn and X-Pac, which Billy Gunn won to win the overall tournament. Another prominent match was a tag team match between The Hardy Boyz (Matt Hardy and Jeff Hardy) defeating The Brood (Edge and Christian).

Production

Background
King of the Ring was a pay-per-view (PPV) event held annually in June by the World Wrestling Federation (WWF, now WWE) since 1993. The PPV featured the King of the Ring tournament, a single-elimination tournament that was established in 1985 and held annually until 1991, with the exception of 1990; these early tournaments were held as special non-televised house shows. The winner of the tournament was crowned "King of the Ring." Unlike the non-televised events, the PPV did not feature all of the tournament's matches. Instead, several of the qualifying matches preceded the event with the final few matches then taking place at the pay-per-view. There were also other matches that took place at the event as it was a traditional three-hour pay-per-view. Considered as one of the WWF's "Big Five" PPVs, along with the Royal Rumble, WrestleMania, SummerSlam, and Survivor Series, the company's five biggest shows of the year, the 1999 event was the seventh King of the Ring PPV and 13th tournament overall. It was held on June 27, 1999 at the Greensboro Coliseum Complex in Greensboro, North Carolina. Triple H was originally supposed to compete in the King of the Ring tournament, but he wanted to compete for the WWF Championship instead, so he gave his spot to Chyna, making her the first and only woman to ever compete in the tournament.

Storylines
The event featured a total of 15 professional wrestling matches, one untelevised match, four shown during Sunday Night Heat and the remaining 10 matches broadcast live on Pay-Per-View (PPV). Some of the matches featured wrestlers who were involved in pre-existing scripted feuds or storylines and others are teamed up with no backstory. Wrestlers themselves portrayed either heels (wrestling term for those who portray the "bad guys") or faces (those who portray the "good guys") as they competed in matches with pre-determined outcomes.

The main feud heading into King of the Ring was between Stone Cold Steve Austin and The McMahons (Vince McMahon and Shane McMahon) in a handicap ladder match. The storyline began at WrestleMania XV, when Austin won the WWF Championship from The Rock. The following months, Vince and Shane had been feuding with each other when Shane took control of The Corporation and later revealed that he was the mastermind behind his sister Stephanie McMahon's abduction at the hands of The Undertaker and his Ministry of Darkness. At the time, Shane and Undertaker joined forces to form the Corporate Ministry. The previous month at Over The Edge, Austin lost the WWF Championship to Undertaker after Shane who served as special referee made a quick three count to ensure Undertaker the victory. 

Three weeks later, it was revealed that the Corporate Ministry served a "greater power" whom they were taking orders from behind the scenes. After Undertaker and Austin's title match ended in a no contest, the Ministry dropped to their knees in the ring and the greater power emerged from the back and revealed himself to Austin who was tied up in the ring ropes. The following week, the greater power was revealed as Vince McMahon who explained that his face turn was a plot to screw Austin out of the WWF Championship. Linda and Stephanie appeared on the stage and Stephanie berated Vince and Shane for using her to get to Austin. Linda then announced that she had stepped down as the CEO of the WWF and has hand-picked her successor, which was revealed to be Stone Cold. Austin announced as CEO that he would be facing the McMahons in a handicap match at King of the Ring. A week later, after Austin dumped cow manure into Vince's office at the WWF headquarters, Vince announced the match would be a ladder match with 100% ownership in a briefcase hanging high above the ring. The following week, Austin defeated Big Bossman in a singles match to ensure there would be no interference from the Corporate Ministry.

The secondary feud heading into King of the Ring was between The Undertaker and The Rock over the WWF Championship. The feud started on the June 7th episode of Raw is War, when Rock faced Triple H in a cast match. As Rock was preparing to drop the People's Elbow on Triple H, Undertaker interfered and dropped Rock with a Tombstone Piledriver on a steel chair. The Big Show made the save chasing away Undertaker. The following week, Rock came out and challenged Undertaker to a title match at King of the Ring. Undertaker accepted the challenge but the McMahons came out and told Rock that he must defeat Undertaker in a non-title match to earn his title shot. Later that night, Shane was about to announce the stipulation for the Rock/Undertaker match but was attacked by Ken Shamrock. When the match got underway though, Triple H came out and announced that the stipulation was that Rock would have to take on both him and Undertaker in a Triple-threat match which Rock won after Chyna accidentally tripped Undertaker during the match. The following week, Rock defeated Edge in singles action. After the match, Undertaker came out and once again dropped Rock with a Tombstone Piledriver. Later that night, Undertaker defended his WWF Championship against Triple H. The match ended in a disqualification when Rock interfered and dropped Undertaker with a Rock Bottom. When a large Brahma Bull symbol (similar to the Undertaker symbol) descended from the rafters, Rock attempted to tie Undertaker to the symbol but Undertaker was saved by his allies in the Corporate Ministry. Paul Bearer was tied to the symbol instead.

King of the Ring tournament bracket
The tournament took place between May 30 and June 27, 1999. The tournament brackets were:

Aftermath
With Austin defeated and the McMahons back in control of the WWF, Shane fired Austin as CEO on Raw the night after King of the Ring. Vince announced that Austin would be placed at the “bottom of the ladder”, where he would stay far away from contendership for any title. He even went as far as demoting Austin to ring crew duties, declaring he would be assisting in the disassembly of the wrestling ring after the show. 

Austin then came out and revealed he had a surprise for the Corporate Ministry. First, while he was still CEO, Austin told the McMahons that he drew up a new contract for himself that not only gave him a raise but enabled him to assault McMahon whenever and wherever he so desired. Then, Austin said that before he took to the ring for the ladder match, he booked a WWF Championship match with The Undertaker defending against him in the main event, and any outside interference by anyone at all would result in Austin winning the title. Austin would go on to defeat Undertaker after hitting him with a Stone Cold Stunner and regained the championship he had lost at Over the Edge.

Reception
In 2018, Kevin Pantoja of 411Mania gave the event a rating of 1.5 [Extremely Horrendous], stating, "Because of how bad the 1995 King of the Ring was, people seem to overlook [how] bad this show was. Only three matches cracked two stars and they barely did so. The tournament itself felt like a major afterthought and not one of those matches was any good at all. Add in the questionable booking and the fact that nothing on this show ended up mattering, and you’ve got a recipe for one of the worst Pay-Per-Views in history. Terrible."

Results

References 

1999
Events in Greensboro, North Carolina
1999 in North Carolina
Professional wrestling in Greensboro, North Carolina
1999 WWF pay-per-view events
June 1999 events in the United States